"Signes" is a promotional single by the French R&B singer Nâdiya, featured on her 2004 studio album 16/9. The song was written by Thierry Gronfier, Mehdy Boussaïd, and Sindbad Ioualalen and produced by Thierry Gronfier. It was only released digitally

Music video
The music video starts in a desert, where a poor Nâdiya repeatedly falls on the sand, due to the drought, searching for water. Then, some clips are show where burglars enter a city in the desert and raiding the locals there. At the first chorus part, Nadiya is shown dancing in the desert, at night, richly dressed. When the second verse starts, Nâdiya wears another dress (a yellow one) and many jewels in a sort of colloseum. Again clips are shown of burglars attacking local people and still in the desert, Nâdiya passes away. At the second chorus, Nâdiya is brought to a village while still unconscious. In there, she gets healed from her dehydration and receives the clan's mark. Meanwhile, a spy seeing this runs back to his boss and reports that he saw Nâdiya. Next, both armies from Nâdiya's side and the enemy fight each other, with old weapons. The video ends with all the three different Nâdiya's dancing on the song, ending with the words "Il suffit de croire", which means "It's enough to believe".

External links
"Signes" lyrics

2005 singles
Nâdiya songs
Songs written by Thierry Gronfier
2004 songs
Sony BMG singles